North Drums are horn-shaped drums that were designed to project their sound outward, so the audience can hear the most direct qualities of the drum.

History
North Drums were invented by then Boston resident and drummer Roger North, while he was a member of band Quill, and later bands the Holy Modal Rounders, The Clamtones and The Freak Mountain Ramblers (Portland, Oregon). North created the fiberglass-shelled drums by hand for his own usage in late 1968, and was granted a U.S. patent, #3603194 on the design in 1971 .

Starting in 1973 he began producing the original commercial configuration of the drums and began selling them both directly and through retail dealers to various top musicians and drummers including Boz Skaggs, Alan White (Yes), Doug "Cosmo" Clifford (Creedence Clearwater), Billy Cobham, Richie Albright (Waylon Jennings), Russ Kunkel (Jackson Browne), Joe English (Wings), W.S. "Fluke" Holland (Johnny Cash), and Gerald Brown (David Bowie) as well as to the general public through retail dealers.

In 1976, North licensed the patent rights to Music Technology Incorporated (MTI) to manufacture and market the drums in hopes of higher production and distribution volume. Under MTI management, the drum shells were produced first by a fiberglass manufacturer in Long Island, then for a time again by Roger North in his facility in Troutdale, Oregon, and eventually in Italy using an injection-molded polystyrene process.

End of the North Drums
They stopped selling the drums in the early 1980s and now there is a used market for the drums, and a small though loyal contingent of North Drum players.

Chad Channing was known for using North Drums in the early years of Nirvana.  Billy Cobham played North Drums early on as well as Credence Clearwater Revival drummer Doug Clifford. Lucky Lehrer of the Circle Jerks used North tom-toms.  The drum set was destroyed by fans slam dancing, but was refurbished by DW’s Louie Garcia, and is on permanent display behind glass at the Hard Rock Hotel & Casino in Las Vegas. Drummer Ted VanTilburg formerly of Morgue played North Drums from 1988 to 1993.  Alan White of the band Yes played North Drums for a while as did Joe English (Wings), Gerry Brown (David Bowie), Russ Kunkel (Jackson Browne), W.S. "Fluke" Holland (Johnny Cash), and Richie Albright (Waylon Jennings).  Although primarily a Ludwig endorser, Alex Van Halen incorporated a set of North Drum toms in his enormous white touring kit for Van Halen's OU812 album in 1988.

Hana of the Japanese band Gacharic Spin also uses North drums. The Long Island Sunrisers Drum and Bugle corps used North Triple drums in 1981. The Concord Blue Devils Drum and Bugle Corps used North Triple drums in 1976.

References

See also 
List of drum makers

Percussion instrument manufacturing companies
Musical instrument manufacturing companies of the United States